The Forest City Stockade was built in central Minnesota to defend settlers in the area  from Indian attacks.  It became famous during the Dakota War of 1862.  Today, visitors to the site can visit a rebuilt stockade and see volunteers in 1800-style dress illustrate period life and activities.  A threshing bee takes place across the road in August.  The site of the stockade is between Litchfield and Forest City near Minnesota State Highway 24.

The following is a list of those who defended the Forest City
Stockade in September 1862 who were mustered in on August 24,
1862 (names noted w/*) and known as the 'Meeker County Volunteers' by August 28, 1862. G. C. Whitcomb claimed to be captain of the
group by the captains commission issued by Colonel H. H. Sibley to send 75 Springfield muskets with him (31 were dropped off in
Hutchinson, who too were in dire need.)

ANGIER, HENDERSON M
ATKINSON, J. B. - Sheriff & County Commissioner - never left Forest City -Elected 1st Lieutenant
BEHRMANN, H.
BRADSHAW, J. H.
BRANHAM, JESSIE V. JR - suggested Forest City stockade construction - scout with Captain Strout was wounded near Acton on September 3
BRANHAM, JESSIE V. SR. - rode 100 miles to get military aid in Sioux uprising.
BRANHAM, WILLIAM H/A - elected 1st Sergeant - had guard duty night of attack - wounded during counterattack on Forest City
CASWELL, WILLIAM
CHAPIN, D.
CHAPIN, E. A. - county commissioner
COBB, JESSE F. - forage detail
CONDON, PATRICK
DANIELSON, NELS - wounded - secured north side during attack
DART, CHANCEY - guard duty the night of attack and gave warning shot
DOUGHERTY, THOMAS
GARRISON, J. B.
GIBBONS, ELI
GIBBONS, OLIVER - forage detail
GORTON, MILTON - never left Forest City
GOULD, FREEMAN L/G - elected 4th Sergeant
GRAYSON, THOMAS - never left Forest City
HAMILTON, ANDREW
HANSON, PETER E
HARVEY, JAMES M - county auditor - never left Forest City - Elected 5th Sergeant - Quarter Master Commission on August 28 - hero during Indian outbreak
HEATH, A. F. - elected 1st Corporal
HEATH, J. 
HILL, H. J. - elected 2nd Corporal
HOLBROOK, D. M.
HOWE, H. S. - elected 2nd Sergeant 
HOYT, AZRO B/ALONZ B - elected 8th Sergeant
HUTCHINS, SAMUEL - elected 4th Corporal
JEWETT, T C (Carlos/Charles) - Register of Deeds - never Left Forest City - elected 3rd Corporal
JOHNSON, HENRY
JOHNSON, W.
KRUGER, CHARLES
KRUGER, HERMAN 
LANG, JAMES B.
LARSON, ANDREW 
LUTONS, H. 
MAYBEE, CHARLES D. 
MCGRAW, CORNELIUS 
MCGRAW, DANIEL - elected 3rd Sergeant
MCGRAW, MICHAEL (JR) 
MERRILL, M. D./NEHEMIAH D.
MICKELSON, HOVER
MORRILL, N. D. (NEHEMIAH) 
MOUSLEY, ALFRED 
NELSON, ANDREW - guard duty the night of attack
NELSON, JAMES H.
OLSON, ASLOG - secured north side of stockade during attack - wounded during counterattack
OLSON, HALGA(R)
PAGE, GEO. R. 
PAYSON, C. E.
RAGAN, THOMAS
RALSTON, R. B. - elected 6th Corporal
REEF, EMANUEL M - (Gottlip?) - provisions guard
ROGERS, JEROME
SCHULTZ, RUDOLPH 
SHOLES, GEORGE S, SR - never left Forest City
SKINNER, THOMAS H - never left Forest City
SMITH, ABNER COMSTOCK - Judge of Probate - never left Forest City
SMITH, HENRY L - never Left Forest City - guard duty the night of attack - fired first return shot at the Indians 
SMITH, LORY (Louis?)
SPERRY, ALBERT C 
STANTON, JUDSON A - Clerk Of Court - never Left Forest City - forage detail
STEVENS, HAMLET - never Left Forest City - elected 2nd Lieutenant - guard duty the night of attack and gave warning shot
STEVENS, SYLVESTER - never Left Forest City - guard duty the night of attack 
SWOUTART, E.
THOMAS, JOSEPH C.
TODD, O. B. 
TORNBORN, NELS 
TOWLER, WM - never left Forest City - provisions guard
WAGGONER, G W 
WHITCOMB, GEORGE C - Treasurer of Meeker Co. 1862, rode from Forest City stockade to Carver & took a boat to St Paul to sound the 
alarm of the attack Aug 22-3, before Jessie Branham did the same thing.
WHITE, N. H. - elected 7th Sergeant
WHITE, S. W. 
WILCOX, WILLIAM H

August 18, 1862
News of the Acton Massacre reached Forest City and within the hour, A. C. Smith, J. B Atkinson, Milton Gorton, and a few others headed for Acton, held an inquest, and upon return to Forest City appeared that 'the whole community was in a panic'.

August 19, 1862 - news of the outbreak on the Minnesota River arrives and A. C. Smith prepares a dispatch to the Governor, asking for good guns and ammunition.

August 20, 1862 - At 6am, sends his message to Governor Ramsey with Jesse V. Branham Sr, the only volunteer of 600 people assembled to deliver the message.

August 21, 1862 - At 1am, the message is delivered to Governor Ramsey, who then found George Whitcomb in Saint Paul and gave him the responsibility with 75 muskets and ammunition. Between the 18th and nightfall, 98 teams, mostly double, have left Forest City east to Clearwater, most teams having between five and twelve people with as much goods as they could pack in a moments haste.

August 22, 1862 - 72 more teams left Forest City.

August 23, 1862 - At 11am, Whitcomb arrives in Forest City by way of Hutchinson and finds almost everyone had deserted Forest City, and decision was made by the ones who 'Never left Forest City' to stay and save what was worth saving.

August 24, 1862 - a military organization was started, with people coming back after placing family with loved ones elsewhere.
The first mission was to go to Kingston on this day and round up horses to use, which they rounded up 33.

August 25, 1862 - 27 men set out west for Monongalia County (northern Kandiyohi County) in pursuit of Indians, but buried seven
people, and passed by ruins of three dwellings and a number of mutilated cattle. This  returned August 27, 1862.

August 27, 1862 - 11 men left west to the Manannah-Union Grove area to obtain stoves, bedding, provisions and stock, stopped
at Wilmot Maybee's home and had dinner, then to Carlos Caswells,
where plans were made to spend the night so they left a yoke of cattle, and proceeded to Silas Caswell's house and put bedding and provisions into the Maybee two horse wagon. At this time, David Hoar, Chancey Wilson, Moody Caswell, Thomas Ryckman, James Nelson, N.C. Caswell, and R.D.C. Cressy set out to recover all the stock they could. Wilmot Maybee and Joseph Page, in Maybee's team, and Phillip Deck and Linus Howe, in Deck's one-horse team, approached the Carlos Caswell residence again, but approximately 15 Indians were waiting, hidden behind a pile of lumber, and shot Page out of the wagon, Deck and Howe were shot at and killed within 350 feet, and Maybee, who ran his team 700 feet before getting cut off, left the team and ran for 500 feet before he was killed. Wilson and Ryckman were close at hand but could not render assistance as their weapons were in the wagons. The party returned to Forest City via Main Prairie, thinking it a safer route, that evening.

August 28, 1862 - 24 men under Lieutenant Atkinson went to the Manannah Massacre scene to bury the dead (three of the four - Maybee was not found until the following spring).

August 30, 1862 - 24 men started for Hutchinson for the 31 guns left there by Whitcomb, but seeing they still needed them, came back August 31 without them.

September 1, 1862 - 17 men and some citizens started for Green Lake on the word there was a family on an island (Green Lake has no islands) but turned back at Swede Grove after a skirmish with the Indians, which two Indians were reportedly killed and soldier Sam Hutchins hit in thigh with a musket ball.

September 2, 1862 - 20 soldiers and 20 citizens set out on
the same mission as the day before, when again they retreated at the
site of approximately three dozen Indians. During the flight back,
O. B. Todd was injured as someone's gun accidentally discharged.

September 3, 1862 - The Forest City Stockade was built by planting a double row of logs on end, three feet into the ground and
ten feet protruding out, approximately 120 feet square.

September 4, 1862 - 250 Indians appeared at 3am, and finding
the stockade, resorted to burning, random shooting and stealing horses which had not been secured yet. Ten to Twelve Indians were reportedly killed, and one soldier injured, one barn and six houses belonging to Wm Richardson, Milton Gorton, James P. Howlett, Dudley Taylor, A. B. Hoyt, William Richards, and A. C Smith burned.
September 15, 1862 - Captain Pettit's Company B 8th Minnesota Infantry Regiment arrived as the first military organization to help in Meeker County. 

October 15, 1862 - The Volunteers disbanded by Governor Ramsey.

References 

Dakota War of 1862
Forts in Minnesota